Anne Mary Hockaday (born 31 May 1962) is a British journalist and academic administrator. Since October 2022, she has been Master of Trinity Hall, Cambridge. She was previously head of the BBC Multimedia Newsroom, and controller of BBC World Service English.

Early life
Hockaday was born in Oxford, attending Oxford High School, an all-girls private school. She studied English at the University of Cambridge where she was an undergraduate student of Trinity Hall, Cambridge. Then, as a Fulbright Scholar, studied journalism (MA) at New York University.

Career
She joined the BBC as a World Service production trainee in 1986. She worked as a correspondent in Prague in the early 1990s and as a reporter, editor, producer for World Service news output. She was also the editor of The World Today.

She was the editor of BBC World Service News and Current Affairs (2001–2006), managing daily and weekly news and current affairs output for 9/11, Afghanistan and the Invasion of Iraq. Her department won a special Sony Gold award for its 9/11 coverage.

In 2007, she became deputy head of the BBC Newsroom, leading the On-Demand, Radio and Mediawire teams. In April 2009, she became Head of the Multimedia Newsroom. In October 2014 she was appointed controller of BBC World Service English. She left the BBC in 2021.

On 31 May 2022, it was announced that she was to become the next Master of Trinity Hall, Cambridge, in succession to Jeremy Morris. She took up the post on 1 October 2022.

She serves as director of the Girls' Day School Trust a group of 25 private schools in the UK and a trustee of the British Library.

Hockaday is author of a biography of Milena Jesenská, a Czech journalist and muse of Franz Kafka.

References 

1962 births
Alumni of Trinity Hall, Cambridge
BBC executives
BBC News people
BBC World Service people
British journalists
People educated at Oxford High School, England
People from Oxford
Living people